Island of the Sun is the debut studio album by Swedish singer-songwriter Winona Oak, released on June 10, 2022, through Atlantic Records.

Track listing 
Island of the Sun track listing

References 

2022 debut albums
Pop albums by Swedish artists
Atlantic Records albums